The Sabrah Light Tank is a tank designed by Elbit Systems based on the ASCOD and Pandur II platforms.

Development 
Sabrah is a tracked or wheeled light tank manufactured by Elbit Systems, a defence manufacturing company based in Israel. It is designed to complement the fleet of armored fighting vehicles (AFVs) operated by the armed forces worldwide. The tracked light tank configuration is based on the tracked ASCOD AFV platform, which is manufactured by Spanish armored vehicles manufacturer General Dynamics European Land Systems - Santa Bárbara Sistemas - (GDELS-SBS), a part of American aerospace and defence company General Dynamics. Elbit Systems received a three-year contract worth $172m to supply the Sabrah light tanks to the Philippine Army (PA) in January 2021.

The wheeled light tank configuration is based on the 8×8 wheeled Pandur II platform supplied by the Czech military vehicles exporter Excalibur Army.

Design 
Weighing 30t, the Sabrah light tank series has a modular design. It is equipped with a common 105mm manned turret for both tracked and wheeled configurations. The vehicle’s fully-electric turret drive provides stabilization in both elevation and traverse. The dual-axis high-performance turret provides hunter-killer capability. The tank provides an optimal combination of firepower and maneuverability. It can be configured to provide enhanced lethality. The Sabrah is fitted with armour protection systems to provide ballistic protection up to NATO STANAG 4569 Level 4. The vehicle can be integrated with active protection systems. It includes the company’s TORCH-X battle management system. The combat-proven armoured vehicle is also installed with electro-optical (EO) sights, fire control systems, and life support systems.

Armament 
The Sabrah light tank is armed with a combination of an Elbit Systems Land 105mm gun and a 7.62mm coaxial machine gun. In addition, the armament includes eight 76mm smoke grenade launchers and two optional anti-tank guided missiles. The 105mm/52 caliber coiled barrel, low recoil gun features a thermal shroud for increased probability of hitting the target. The gun is equipped with an integrated muzzle brake system. It fires at a rate of six rounds per minute with an effective range of 3,600m. The gun uses NATO standard ammunition including armor-piercing fin-stabilized discarding sabot (APFSDS), high-explosive squash head (HESH), and high-explosive plastic tracer (HEP-T) rounds. The high-explosive multi-purpose tracer (HE-MP-T) M110 round can also be fired from the 105mm gun. It can provide a lethal strike capability with high hit probability and low collateral damage. The ammunition is loaded using an autoloader with a manual backup loading. The tank has 12 ready-to-use ammunition rounds located in the autoloader drum and an additional 24 stored in the hull. The machine gun uses 500 ready-to-fire rounds of 7.62mm and 1,500 rounds stowed in the hull.

Observation and fire control 
The light tank can be equipped with a panoramic sight system with day and night-vision EO sensors for effective fighting support during day and night in all weather conditions. The panoramic sight is used to observe and aim targets effectively. A high-definition color camera with zoom is used for daylight operations, while a thermal sight with 3µ to 6µ detector is used for night vision operations. The Sabrah tank can launch fire on fixed and mobile targets due to the dual-axis line of sight stabilization. A sophisticated fire control system aboard the tank controls the fire and assists in targeting and engagement of the target.

Communications and sensors onboard Sabrah 
The system features navigation and communication systems, including E-LynX software-defined radio. An auto-tracker system increases the hit probability of the system on the move, while a laser range finder aboard the tank can measure distances of 7,000m. Meteorological sensors can be incorporated optionally to measure variables such as wind, pressure and temperature for improved ballistics. Other optional systems include a laser warning system, and see-through head-mounted display technology.

Variants

ASCOD 2 Sabrah

The Philippine Army categorizes this version as a "Tracked" Light Tank. The base platform is th ASCOD 2, which has a seven-wheel station chassis. It has a NATO STANAG 4569 Level 4 ballistic protection. It provides advanced mobility and mine protection capabilities due to ongoing technology upgrades, which are possible thanks to the open system architecture of the platform. The vehicle is powered by an eight-cylinder diesel engine coupled to a hydro-mechanical transmission system.

Pandur II Sabrah
The Philipine Army categorizes this version as a "Wheeled" Light Tank. The base platform is the Pandur II, which features a robust chassis with higher ground clearance and enhanced protection. The heavy-duty chassis enables high off-road performance. The 8×8 vehicle is designed to carry up to 14 crew. The platform is equipped with an automatic drivetrain management system, which adjusts the power supplied to each axle and wheel based on the terrain surface and driving conditions. The power pack includes a Cummins Diesel ISLe T450 HPCR engine with automatic transmission, and cooling system. Other components of the power pack include electric generator, air intake and exhaust systems, air-condition compressor, hydraulic pump, and drive shaft.

Operators 

  – Elbit Systems won the Light Tank Acquisition Project of the Philippine Army. Under the terms of the contract, Elbit Systems will supply several configurations of vehicles, including: 18 tracked light tanks based on the ASCOD 2 platform, 10 wheeled light tanks based on the Pandur II platform as well as an additional 1 command vehicle and 1 recovery vehicle based on the ASCOD 2 platform.  The original Philippine Army requirement calls for a fleet of 144 light tanks/tank destroyers.

See also 

 ASCOD
 Pandur II

Contemporary competitors
 Griffin II
 Type 15 tank, or VT-5 (export model)
 Kaplan MT / Harimau

Tanks with similar firepower
 CV90105
 K21-105
 M8 Armored Gun System
 2S25 Sprut-SD
 TAM
 WPB Anders

Tanks with autoloaders
Post–Cold War light tanks
Military vehicles introduced in the 2010s
2022 introductions

References